The Municipality of Annandale was a local government area of Sydney, New South Wales, Australia. The municipality was proclaimed on 29 December 1893 as the Borough of Annandale when the East Ward of Leichhardt Council separated, and, with an area of 1.4 square kilometres, covered the entire suburb of Annandale, excepting a small block between Johnstons Creek, Booth Street and Parramatta Road. The council was amalgamated with the Municipality of Leichhardt (now the Inner West Council) to the west with the passing of the Local Government (Areas) Act 1948.

Council history and location
The area of Annandale, bounded by Whites Creek and Johnstons Creek in the west and east respectively and by Rozelle Bay and Parramatta Road in the north and south respectively, was first incorporated in 1871 when it was included as the East Ward within the Municipality of Leichhardt. However, the governing act in the Colony of New South Wales for local government, the Municipalities Act 1867, provided for the division of an existing municipality if a petition was made to the Governor by at least two-thirds of residents or owners of rateable property in the area. As a consequence, a requisite petition of the electors of the East Ward, which argued that the East Ward benefited little from its inclusion in Leichhardt and proposed a separate Borough of Annandale, was published in the Government Gazette on 17 June 1893.

The Borough of Annandale was subsequently proclaimed by Governor Sir Robert Duff on 29 December 1893 and was constituted on 1 February 1894. The council first met in the Methodist School Hall on Trafalgar Street on 14 February 1894, with all three former East Ward aldermen having been returned the day before, including Alderman John Young, who was elected as the first Mayor of Annandale. The first purpose-built Annandale Council Chambers, on Johnston Street, was completed at a cost of £1528 and was officially opened on 21 September 1899 by Mayor Allen Taylor in the presence of the Member for Annandale, William Mahony. From 28 December 1906, with the passing of the Local Government Act, 1906, the council was renamed as the "Municipality of Annandale". In 1937 various minor boundary transfers around the Johnstons Creek area were made between Annandale and The Glebe Council. The longest serving alderman was Edward Hogan, who served 38 years as an alderman from 1906 to 1944 including several terms as mayor.

By the end of the Second World War, the NSW Government had come to the conclusion that its ideas of infrastructure expansion could not be realised by the present system of the mostly-poor inner-city municipal councils and the Minister for Local Government, Joseph Cahill, pushed through a bill in 1948 that abolished a significant number of those councils. Annandale was abolished and amalgamated with the Municipality of Leichhardt following the enactment of the Local Government (Areas) Act 1948, which came into effect from 1 January 1949. The former Annandale Municipality became the first ward of the Leichhardt Municipal Council returning four aldermen.

Mayors

Town Clerks

References

Annandale
Annandale
Annandale
 
Inner West
Annandale, New South Wales